Saint-Ours is a commune in the Savoie department in the Auvergne-Rhône-Alpes region in south-eastern France.

It has its dynamic association of young people : Les amis du village, and its famous festival : La fête de la bâteuse

See also
Communes of the Savoie department

References

Communes of Savoie